The Woman's Club of Eustis is a historic woman's club in Eustis, Florida, United States. It is located at 227 North Center Street. On August 5, 1991, it was added to the U.S. National Register of Historic Places.

See also
List of Registered Historic Woman's Clubhouses in Florida

References

External links
 Lake County listings at National Register of Historic Places
 Florida's Office of Cultural and Historical Programs
 Lake County listings
 Women's Club of Eustis
 Woman's Club of Eustis Website

Gallery

National Register of Historic Places in Lake County, Florida
Women's clubs in Florida
Women's club buildings in Florida
Eustis, Florida